Stanislav Volodymyrovych Boklan (born 12 January 1960, in Brusyliv, Zhytomyr Oblast, Ukrainian SSR) is a Ukrainian theater and film actor.

Early life 
Boklan was born on January 12, 1960, in Brusyliv, Zhytomyr Oblast. In 1984, he graduated from the Kyiv National I. K. Karpenko-Kary Theatre, Cinema and Television University.

Theater 
Boklan joined the Kyiv Academic Young Theatre in 1994. He stayed with the theater group until early 2020, then left the group for unknown reasons.

Personal life 
Stanislav has one younger brother, Mykola Boklan, who is also an actor.

Filmography

Television

Film

State awards 

 On 18 August 2006, Boklan would earn the Honored Artist of Ukraine award "for significant personal contribution to the socioeconomic and cultural development of the Ukrainian state, significant labor achievements and on the occasion of the 15th anniversary of Ukraine's independence".
 On 22 January 2016, Boklan would earn the People's Artist of Ukraine award "for significant personal contribution to state building, socio-economic, scientific and technical, cultural and educational development of the Ukrainian state, the consolidation of Ukrainian society, [and] many hard years of work".

References 

1960 births
Living people
Ukrainian male stage actors
Recipients of the title of People's Artists of Ukraine
Ukrainian male film actors
Ukrainian male television actors
People from Zhytomyr Oblast